This is a list of people from Windsor, Ontario.

This list includes people from the Windsor-Essex County area (Amherstburg, Essex, Kingsville, Lakeshore, LaSalle, Leamington, Tecumseh, and Windsor).

A
 Meghan Agosta (born 1987), Canadian Women's Hockey League (CWHL) player and Olympic medalist
 Ian Allison (1909–1990), Olympic silver medalist in basketball (1936)
 Glen Angus (1970–2007), Canadian artist whose work has appeared in role-playing games and video games
 Albert Anstey (born 1966), former darts player
 Oshiomogho Atogwe (born 1981), former NFL player, analyst on TSN

B
 Steve Bacic (born 1965), actor, raised in Windsor
 Ahmad Bateman (born 1961), former professional golfer
 Iain Baxter& (born 1936), OC, Governor General Award-winning visual artist, forerunner of Canadian conceptual art
 Matt Beleskey (born 1988), NHL player
 Michael Dougall Bell (1943–2017), Canada's Ambassador to Jordan (1987–90)
 Brett Bellemore (born 1988), former NHL player
 Dave Beneteau (born 1967), former UFC fighter and wrestler
 Douglas G. Bergeron (born 1960), CEO, investor, philanthropist
 Reno Bertoia (1935–2011), former MLB baseball player
 Alan Bernard (1934–2011), Emmy award winning sound engineer
 Hank Biasatti (1922–1996), former MLB baseball player and National Basketball Association basketball player
 James Bondy (born c. 1974), entertainer, star of the children's show Ribert and Robert's Wonderworld
 Bob Boughner (born 1971), former NHL player and current head coach of the San Jose Sharks. Also part-owner of Ontario Hockey League's Windsor Spitfires
 Pat Boutette (born 1952), former NHL player
 Bill Brady (born 1932), CM, journalist
 Trish Brown (born 1963), national education advocate, first openly lesbian school board president in the State of Michigan
 Mike Brkovich (born 1958), former NBA player, businessman
 Brian Bulcke (born 1987), former CFL player
 Seth Bullock (1849–1919), merchant and U.S. Marshal famous for tenure in Deadwood, SD
 Ted Bulley (born 1955), former NHL player
 Sean Burke (born 1967), former NHL player
 Jeff Burrows (born 1968), drummer of The Tea Party

C
 Stuart Chatwood (born 1969), bass player of The Tea Party, composer for video game Prince of Persia: The Sands of Time
 Frank Chauvin (1933–2015), former police detective, resigned from Order of Canada over abortion rights
 Kenneth Church (1930–2020), jockey, Windsor / Essex County Sports Hall of Fame inductee
 Stubby Clapp (born 1973), former MLB baseball player, current first base coach for the St. Louis Cardinals
 Peter D. Clark (born 1938), Regional Chair of Ottawa-Carlton (1991-1997)
 Jay Justin "Nig" Clarke (1882–1949), former MLB player and member of the Canadian Baseball Hall of Fame.
 Dorothy Collins (1926–1994), singer, actress, and recording artist
 Arjen Colquhoun (born 1992), CFL player 
 Joe Comartin (born 1947), former politician
 Greg Constantine (born 1938), artist
 Dave Cooke (born 1952), politician, former Minister of Education
 Peter Cory (1925–2020), CC, Supreme Court of Canada judge from 1989 to 1999
 Aileen H. Cowan (born 1926), Canadian painter and sculptor
 Jack Cowin (born 1942), billionaire, founder of Hungry Jack's
 Tyrone Crawford (born 1989), former NFL player 
 Sharon Creelman (born 1964), field hockey player
 David Croll (1900–1991), former mayor of Windsor, first Jew appointed to a federal or provincial cabinet in Canada
 Keith Crowder (born 1959), former NHL player
 Emilia Cundari (1930–2005), operatic soprano

D
 George Dadamo (born 1953), former MPP (1990–1995)
 Scott D'Amore (born 1974), professional wrestler, manager and booker
 Ken Daneyko (born 1964), former NHL player
 Jaime D (born 1976), also known as Sirelda, former professional wrestler
 Edward Dawson (1907–1998), Olympic silver medalist in basketball (1936)
 Alexander Deans (born 1997), inventor, artist, and public speaker
 Andy Delmore (born 1976), former NHL player
 Johnny Devine (born 1974), professional wrestler
 Roman De Angelis (born 2001), professional racing driver in the IMSA SportsCar Championship
 Drew Dilkens (born 1972), present mayor of Windsor
 Michael DiPietro (born 1999), NHL player
 Jesse Divnich, industry personality and analyst, video games (from LaSalle)
 Roxi DLite (born 1983), burlesque performer
 Tie Domi (born 1969), former NHL player (from Belle River)
 Charles Drake (1920–1998), CC, Canadian neurosurgeon known for his work on treating aneurysms
 Dwight Duncan (born 1959), former Finance Minister of Ontario

E
 Murray Eaves (born 1960), former NHL player
 Aaron Ekblad (born 1996), NHL player
 Hoda ElMaraghy (born 1945), CM, first woman to serve as dean of engineering at a Canadian university

F
 Christine Fellows (born 1968), musician
 Ron Fellows (born 1959), former NASCAR driver
 Colm Feore (born 1958), OC, actor
 Bob Ferguson (1931–2014), sports journalist and writer
 John Ferguson, Sr. (1938–2007), former NHL player and executive
 Katie Findlay (born 1990), actress
 Cam Fowler (born 1991), NHL player
 Eddie Francis (born 1974), former mayor of Windsor
 Ron Friest (born 1958), former NHL player

G
 Frances M. Gage (1924–2013), sculptor
 Marty Gervais (born 1946), poet and publisher
 Barbara Gowdy (born 1950), CM, novelist
 Mary Henrietta Graham (1857 or 1858–1890), first black woman to be admitted to, as well as to graduate from, the University of Michigan
 Herb Gray (1931–2014), CC, former Liberal Member of Parliament and former Deputy Prime Minister of Canada
 Tony Gray, comic book illustrator

H
 Mary Jo Haddad (born 1957), CM, former President and CEO of The Hospital for Sick Children, first female Chancellor at the University of Windsor
 Richie Hawtin (born 1970), techno musician
 Frank Hayden, OC, professor and pioneer of the Special Olympics
 George Hester (1902–1951), Olympic athlete
 Ken Hodge Jr. (born 1966), former NHL player
 David H. Hubel (1926–2013), research scientist and Nobel Prize winner
 Garth Hudson (born 1937), CM, organist and keyboardist for Canadian rock group The Band
 Michael D. Hurst (born 1950), former mayor of Windsor, Justice of the Peace

I

J
 Dan Jancevski (born 1981), former NHL player
 Alaric Jackson (born 1998), current NFL player
 Gordie Johnson (born 1964), guitarist and vocalist of Big Sugar
 Spider Jones (born 1946), former boxer
 Ed Jovanovski (born 1976), former NHL player
 Jeon So-mi (birthname Ennik Somi Douma) (born 2001), South Korean singer

K

 Zack Kassian (born 1991), NHL player with Edmonton Oilers
 Jerry Kauric (born 1963), former NFL and CFL player
 Rick Kehoe (born 1951), former NHL player and coach
 Ruth Kerr (1916–1974), athlete, 1932 Summer Olympics, at age 16; first Windsor-born person to represent Canada in Olympics 
 Tim Kerr (born 1960), former NHL player
 Malcolm Knight, Vice Chairman of Deutsche Bank and former General Manager of Bank for International Settlements
 Robert Knuckle (born 1935), historian, bestselling author, actor and playwright
 Killer Kowalski (1926–2008), WWE Hall of Famer, professional wrestler and trainer
 Tomasz Kucharzewski (1968–2008), martial artist

L
 Mathew Charles Lamb (1948–1976), spree killer acquitted on grounds of insanity, later killed in action while fighting for the Rhodesian Security Forces
 Thomas W. LaSorda (born 1954), former CEO of Chrysler Canada Group
 Karen Lawrence (born 1951), writer
 Mike Lazaridis (born 1961), OC, CEO of Research in Motion, inventor of the BlackBerry
 Lou Lefaive (1928–2002), Canadian sports administrator and civil servant
 Ken Lewenza, Sr. (born 1954), former head of the Canadian Auto Workers
 Marion Lewis (born 1925), OC, Canadian medical researcher known for her work on the Rh factor
 Aaron Lowe (born 1974), former pairs figure skater with Megan Wing
 Budd Lynch (1917–2012), announcer for the Detroit Red Wings

M

 Sir Archibald Macdonell (1864–1941), decorated Canadian police officer and soldier
 Angus MacInnes (born 1947), actor
 Alistair MacLeod (1936–2014), OC, novelist, short story writer, and academic
 Marco Marsan (born 1957), author
 Jeff Martin (born 1969), guitarist and lead vocalist of The Tea Party
 Matt Martin (born 1989), NHL player for the New York Islanders
 Paul Martin (born 1938), Liberal former Prime Minister of Canada
 Paul Martin Sr. (1903–1992), longtime federal cabinet minister; father of the former PM
 Sheila Martin (born 1943), wife of former Prime Minister Paul Martin
 Medo Martinello (born 1935), former NLA lacrosse player, NLL Quebec Caribous and MILL Detroit Turbos lacrosse coach, IHL and NCAA hockey referee
 Brian Masse (born 1968), politician
 Kylie Masse (born 1996), swimmer, two-time Olympic medalist and World Champion in 100 m backstroke
 Brandon McBride (born 1994), Olympian, 800m runner, Canadian National Record Holder
 Sean McCann (1935–2019), actor
 Howard McCurdy (1932–2018), the New Democratic Party's first African-Canadian Member of Parliament
 Gordon Morton McGregor (1873-1922), a Canadian businessman who founded the Ford Motor Company of Canada in 1904 
 Irving "Toots" Meretsky (1912–2006), Olympic silver medalist in basketball (1936)
 Steve Moore (born 1978), former NHL player
 Eugene McNamara (1930–2016), poet, novelist, University of Windsor English Professor Emeritus
 Eddie Mio (born 1954), former NHL player
 Noelle Montcalm (born 1988), Olympic hurdler
 Mychal Mulder (born 1994), NBA player

N
 Stanley Nantais (1913–2004), Olympic silver medalist in basketball (1936)
 Isabelle Nélisse (born 2003), actress
 Sophie Nélisse (born 2000), actress in movies including The Book Thief
 Dan Newman (born 1952), former NHL player

O

 Joseph "Gerry" Ouellette (1934–1975), Olympic gold medalist in Men's shooting

P
 Mark Paré (born 1957), former NHL linesman
 Alton C. Parker (1907–1989), CM, first black Canadian police detective
 Christina Pazsitzky (born 1976), Canadian-American comedian
 Richard Peddie (born 1947), former president and CEO of Maple Leaf Sports and Entertainment
 Maryse Perreault (born 1964), former short track speed skater
 Ed Philion (born 1970), former NFL and CFL player
 Jacqueline Pillon (born 1977), actress
 Casey Plett (born 1987), writer
 Oliver Platt (born 1960), television and film actor
 Lloyd Pollock (1909–1993), president of the Canadian Amateur Hockey Association
 Barry Potomski (1972–2011), former NHL player
 Cathy Priestner (born 1956), speed skater, 1976 Winter Olympics, silver medalist in 500-metre event
 Valerie Pringle (born 1953), CM, journalist & TV Host
 Bob Probert (1965–2010), former NHL player
 Sandra Pupatello (born 1962), politician
 Matt Puempel (born 1993), former NHL player

Q
 Joel Quenneville (born 1958), former NHL player and former NHL head coach of 4 teams. 3x Stanley Cup winner.

R
 Rob Raco (born 1989), actor, musician
 Amanda Reason (born 1993), Olympic swimmer, former world record holder
 J. Paul Reddam (born 1955), academic, businessman, racehorse owner
 Mark Renaud (born 1959), former NHL player
 Brett Romberg (born 1979), former NFL player
 Ernestine Russell (born 1938), first female Olympic gymnast, 1956 Melbourne Summer games
 Warren Rychel (born 1967), former NHL player

S
 Lionel Sanders (born 1988), triathlete
 Cid Samson (born 1943), former MP
 Dave Schreiber (born 1944), NHL play-by-play man
 Erika Schmutz (born 1973), paralympic athlete (wheelchair rugby)
 Jack Scott (1936–2019), rockabilly singer
 Tyler Scott (born 1985), former CFL player
 Kim Shaw (born 1984), actress
 Dakoda Shepley (born 1994), NFL player, minor acting role as Omega Red in Deadpool 2., and stunt and body double in Game Over, Man!
 Larry Shreve (born 1941), National Wrestling Alliance (NWA) professional wrestler known as Abdullah the Butcher (WWE Hall of Famer)
 Joe Siddall (born 1967), former MLB baseball player
 Bob Simpson (1930–2007), former CFL player 
 Thomas Joseph Simpson (1921–2017), one of the 114 Canadians to receive the Distinguished Service Medal for World War II service.
 Jeff Sinasac (born 1973), actor 
 Jagmeet Singh (born 1979), politician and leader of the federal New Democratic Party
 Jimmy Skinner (1917–2007), former NHL coach and executive
 Art Skov (1928–2009), former NHL referee
 Glen Skov (1931–2013), former NHL player
 Brad Smith (born 1958), former NHL player, nicknamed "Motor City Smitty"
 D. J. Smith (born 1977), former NHL player, current head coach of the Ottawa Senators
 Brad Snyder (born 1976), Olympic athlete  1996, 2000, 2004
 David Sobolov (born 1964), voice actor and director
 Skip Spence (1946–1999), composer, multi-instrumentalist, member of Jefferson Airplane, Moby Grape
 William W. Spencer (1921–2007), Emmy award winning cinematographer
 Niki Spiridakos (born 1975), actress
 The Reverend J O L Spracklin (1886–?), Methodist minister who killed an illicit trader in alcohol in 1920, later tried and acquitted
 Dave Steen (born 1959), CM, decathlete, Olympic bronze medal winner
 Marta Stępień (born 1994), Miss Universe Canada 2018
 Alek Stojanov (born 1973), former NHL player
 John Swainson (1925–1994), Governor of Michigan 1961–1963
 Mark Suzor (born 1956), former NHL player

T
 Tamia (born 1975), R&B singer
 Chris Taylor, lawyer, Global President of eOne Music
 Fred Thomas (1923–1981), multi-sport athlete (baseball, basketball, football)
 Shirley Thomson (1930–2010), CC, civil servant
 Ray Timgren (1928–1999), former NHL player
 Daryl Townsend (born 1985), CFL player
 Keegan Connor Tracy (born 1971), actress
 David Tremblay (born 1987), freestyle wrestler, 2012 Olympian
 Tim Trimper (born 1958), former NHL player
 William Troy (1827–1905), abolitionist and preacher
 John Tucker (born 1964), former NHL player
 Shania Twain, OC (born 1965), country singer

U
 John Upham (born 1940), former MLB player

V
 Daniel Victor (born 1979), singer, songwriter, producer of Neverending White Lights
 André Viger (1952–2006), OC, multi-time Paralympic athlete and medalist
 Christian Vincent (born 1980), actor, dancer, choreographer
 Tessa Virtue (born 1989), CM, ice dancer, Olympic gold medallist and World Champion with her partner Scott Moir
 Harold Vokes (1908–1998), malacologist and paleontologist

W
 Hiram Walker (1816–1899), founder of distillery
 Aaron Ward (born 1973), former NHL player, now hockey analyst for TSN
 Felix Watts (1892–1966), inventor
 Kyle Wellwood (born 1983), former NHL player
 Solomon White (1836–1911), lawyer and politician
 Petey Williams (born 1981), professional wrestler
 Robert S. C. Williams, CM, humanitarian
 Tom Williams (born 1951), former NHL player
 Kortney Wilson (born 1979), professional house-flipper and musician
 Luke Willson (born 1990), former NFL player
 Ron Wilson (born 1955), former NHL player and coach
 Ryan Wilson (born 1987), former NHL player
 Megan Wing (born 1975), former pairs figure skater with Aaron Lowe
 Jacqueline MacInnes Wood (born 1987), actress

X

Y

Z
 Alexander Zonjic (born 1951), jazz musician

References

 
Windsor
Windsor